The 2017 French Super Series was the tenth Super Series tournament of the 2017 BWF Super Series. The tournament took place at Stade Pierre de Coubertin in Paris, France from October 24 – 29, 2017 and had a total purse of $325,000.

Men's singles

Seeds

Top half

Bottom half

Finals

Women's singles

Seeds

Top half

Bottom half

Finals

Men's doubles

Seeds

Top half

Bottom half

Finals

Women's doubles

Seeds

Top half

Bottom half

Finals

Mixed doubles

Seeds

Top half

Bottom half

Finals

References

External links
 Tournament Link

French
2017 in French sport
French Open (badminton)
French Super Series
International sports competitions hosted by Paris